May 2 - Eastern Orthodox Church calendar - May 4

All fixed commemorations below celebrated on May 16 by Orthodox Churches on the Old Calendar.

For May 3rd, Orthodox Churches on the Old Calendar commemorate the Saints listed on April 20.

Saints
 Martyrs Timothy the Reader and his wife Moura of Antinoöpolis in Egypt (304)
 Martyrs Diodoros and Rodopianos, at Aphrodisia in Anatolia, by stoning (285-305)  (see also April 29)
 Holy 27 Martyrs who died by fire.
 Great martyr Xenia of Peloponnesus, Wonderworker (318)
 Saint Mamai the Katholikos of Georgia (744)
 Saint Michael of Ulompo, Georgia (9th century)
 Saint Arsenius of Georgia (9th century)
 Saint Peter the Wonderworker, Bishop of Argolis (925)
 Saint Ecumenius, Bishop of Trikala, the Wonderworker (10th century)

Pre-Schism Western saints
 Saint Alexander I, the fifth Pope of Rome (c. 106-115)
 Martyrs Alexander, Eventius and Theodulus (c. 113-119)
 Saint Juvenal of Narni (c. 369/377)
 Saint Glywys (Gluvias) of Cornwall (5th century)
 Saint Scannal of Cell-Coleraine in Ireland, a disciple of St Columba (563)
 Saint Adalsindis, sister of St Waldalenus, founder of the Monastery of Bèze in France, Abbess of a convent near Bèze (c. 680)
 Saint Æthelwine (Elwin, Ethelwin), Bishop of Lindsey (c. 700)
 Saint Philip of Worms (770) (Philip of Zell)
 Saint Ansfried, Bishop of Utrecht (1010)

Post-Schism Orthodox saints
 Saint Theodosius, abbot of the Kiev Caves Monastery and founder of cenobitic monasticism in Russia (1074)
 St. Theophanes of Vatopedi, Metropolitan of Peritheorion (near Xanthi) (14th century)
 Schema-abbess Juliana (1393) and Schema-nun Eupraxia (1394), of the Monastery of the Conception in Moscow
 Saint Gregory Archbishop of Rostov, Yiaroslavl and White Lake (Abbott of Kamennoi Monastery (Monastery of the Transfiguration) at Kubenski Lake, in Vologda province) (1416)
 Martyr Saint Ahmet the Calligrapher of Constantinople (1682)
 Martyr Paul of Vilnius, Lithuania (17th century)
 New Martyrs Anastasia and Christodoulos, at Achaea (1821)
 Saint Irodion of Lainici, Abbot of Lainici Monastery in Romania (1900)

New martyrs and confessors
 New Hieromartyr Nicholas Benevolsky, priest of Alma-Ata (1941)

Other commemorations
 Translation of the relics of Saint Luke of Mt. Stirion (953)
 Translation of the Dormition Icon of the Mother of God from Constantinople, to the Kiev-Pechersk Far Caves (1073)
 "Svenskaya" (Kiev Caves) Icon of the Most Holy Theotokos (1288)

Icon gallery

Notes

References

Sources
 May 3/16, Orthodox Calendar (PRAVOSLAVIE.RU)
 May 16, 2011 / May 3, HOLY TRINITY RUSSIAN ORTHODOX CHURCH (A parish of the Patriarchate of Moscow)
 May 3. OCA - The Lives of the Saints.
 AN ENGLISH ORTHODOX CALENDAR
 May 3. Latin Saints of the Orthodox Patriarchate of Rome.
 May 3, The Roman Martyrology.
 The Roman Martyrology. Transl. by the Archbishop of Baltimore. Last Edition, According to the Copy Printed at Rome in 1914. Revised Edition, with the Imprimatur of His Eminence Cardinal Gibbons. Baltimore: John Murphy Company, 1916. pp. 125–126.
Greek Sources
 Great Synaxaristes:  3 ΜΑΪΟΥ, ΜΕΓΑΣ ΣΥΝΑΞΑΡΙΣΤΗΣ.
  Συναξαριστής. 3 Μαΐου. ECCLESIA.GR. (H ΕΚΚΛΗΣΙΑ ΤΗΣ ΕΛΛΑΔΟΣ). 
Russian Sources
  16 мая (3 мая). Православная Энциклопедия под редакцией Патриарха Московского и всея Руси Кирилла (электронная версия). (Orthodox Encyclopedia - Pravenc.ru).
  3 мая (ст.ст.) 16 мая 2013 (нов. ст.). Русская Православная Церковь Отдел внешних церковных связей. (DECR).

May in the Eastern Orthodox calendar